Yelheri is a panchayat village in the southern state of Karnataka, India. Administratively, Yelahar is under Yadgir Taluka of Yadgir District in Karnataka.  The village of Yelheri is 6 km by road west of the village of Konkal, and 10 km by road south-southeast of the village of Paspool.  The nearest railhead is in Yadgir.

There are four villages in the gram panchayat: Yelheri, Ghanpur, Nawaburz, and Totlur.

Demographics 
At the 2001 census, the village of Yelheri had 4,214 inhabitants, with 2,085 males and 2,129 females.

Notes

External links 
 

Villages in Yadgir district